Arto Tukio (born April 4, 1981) is a Finnish former professional ice hockey defenceman.

Playing career
Tukio began his career with Ilves his hometown team.  He was drafted 101st overall by the New York Islanders in the 2000 NHL Entry Draft but never made it to the North American leagues and remained in Scandinavia.  After three seasons with Ilves, Tukio moved to Jokerit.  In 2004, he moved to the Swedish Elitserien with Frölunda HC where he won the Swedish Championship.  After two more years with Frölunda, Tukio returned to Ilves in 2007.

Career statistics

Regular season and playoffs

International

External links

1981 births
Finnish ice hockey defencemen
Frölunda HC players
Ilves players
Jokerit players
Living people
New York Islanders draft picks
Ice hockey people from Tampere